is a Japanese footballer who plays for Grulla Morioka.

Club statistics
Updated to 23 February 2018.

References

External links

Profile at Grulla Morioka

1987 births
Living people
Kokushikan University alumni
Association football people from Tokyo
Japanese footballers
J3 League players
Japan Football League players
Arte Takasaki players
Fukushima United FC players
Iwate Grulla Morioka players
Association football defenders